The 1947 Buffalo Bulls football team was an American football team that represented the University of Buffalo as an independent during the 1947 college football season. In its ninth and final season under head coach Jim Peele, the team compiled an 8–1 record.

The team was led by Bill Rudick. Coach Peelle rated Rudick as his best all-around player. Rudick played on offense where he was known as an excellent blocking back and for his "hard-hitting style" of carrying the ball and on defense for his "jarring tackles".

Schedule

References

Buffalo
Buffalo Bulls football seasons
Buffalo Bulls f